"The Sea Is a Good Place to Think of the Future" is a song by Welsh indie pop band Los Campesinos!, released on 2 September 2009 as the lead single to their third studio album, Romance is Boring.

An accompanying music video was shot in Barry Island and directed by band bassist Ellen Waddell.

In 2020, it was ranked number 90 on the "100 Greatest Emo Songs of All Time" list by Vulture.

In November 2021, the band released a remastered version of the track, coinciding with the tenth anniversary of Romance is Boring.

Reception 
The song was named the week's "best new track" by music publication Pitchfork, with reviewer Ryan Dombal praising its "grand arrangements and transcendental gut-wrenching" lyricism.

Interpreting the lyrics to tell the story of a suicidal girl and her lover, Vulture writer Ian Cohen described the track as "five uninterrupted minutes of tidal post-rock" and a "future genre classic, even if no one really knew what to call it".

Personnel
 Ellen Waddell – bass guitar
 Gareth Paisey – writing, vocals, glockenspiel
 Harriet Coleman – violin, keyboard
 Neil Turner – guitar
 Ollie Briggs – drums
 Tom Bromley – lead guitar
 Aleksandra Berditchevskaia – keyboard, vocals
 John Goodmanson - producer

References

2009 singles
Los Campesinos! songs
2009 songs
Wichita Recordings singles
Songs about suicide
Songs about depression